is a Japanese avant-garde jazz pianist, accordionist and composer.

Early life
Fujii was born in Tokyo on 9 October 1958. She started playing the piano at age 4, receiving classical training until she was 20, when she became interested in improvisation and jazz. In her twenties, she received instruction in jazz from pianist Fumio Itabashi in Tokyo.

Later life and career
Fujii went to the United States in 1985, graduating from the Berklee College of Music in Boston in 1987, returning to the US in 1993, achieving a graduate diploma in Jazz Performance from the New England Conservatory of Music in 1996. While at the Conservatory, she also had lessons with pianist Paul Bley, "which consisted largely of conversation over cappuccinos, [and] eased her toward self-expression." In 1996, their duo album, Something About Water, was released; Fujii commented that it was a major event for her: "I started to accept myself, little by little." She returned to Japan with her new husband, trumpeter Natsuki Tamura, leader of Gato Libre. She leads various big bands in Japan, such as Orchestra Tokyo. She established Orchestra New York in 1997.

Around 2007, the quartet ma-do was created, consisting of Fujii, Tamura, bassist Norikatsu Koreyasu and drummer Akira Horikoshi. In 2010, Fujii co-founded Kaze, a group containing herself, Tamura, trumpeter Christian Pruvost and drummer Peter Orins. She has played accordion on recordings by the band established by Tamura, Gato Libre, including DuDu and Kuro.

Fujii has recorded prolifically: between 1996 and 2009 she released more than 40 albums. In 2018, she released an album every month to celebrate turning 60.

Since the beginning of the COVID-19 pandemic, Fujii and Tamura have been releasing albums recorded in their home studio on Bandcamp on a regular (monthly or bi-monthly) basis.

In December 2022, Fujii released the 100th album under her own name, auspiciously entitled “Hyaku One Hundred Dreams”.

Playing style
The Down Beat reviewer of Under the Water, a piano duet album with Myra Melford, stated that "Fujii varies dynamics widely, jump-cutting from a fierce, free barrage to a sprinkle of single, crystalline notes."

Discography

References

External links
 Official website
 Satoko Fujii's MySpace page
 Satoko Fujii interview at allaboutjazz.com

Avant-garde jazz pianists
Berklee College of Music alumni
Free jazz pianists
Japanese jazz composers
Japanese jazz pianists
Japanese women pianists
Living people
1958 births
21st-century pianists
21st-century Japanese women musicians
Leo Records artists
21st-century women pianists